Gary Sutton (born 2 February 1962) was an English professional association footballer of the 1980s. He played in the Football League for Gillingham, making 11 appearances.

References

1962 births
Living people
People from Folkestone
English footballers
Association football goalkeepers
Gillingham F.C. players
English Football League players